The Nineteenth Dynasty of Egypt (notated Dynasty XIX), also known as the Ramessid  dynasty, is classified as the second Dynasty of the Ancient Egyptian New Kingdom period, lasting from 1292 BC to 1189 BC. The 19th Dynasty and the 20th Dynasty furthermore together constitute an era known as the Ramesside period. This Dynasty was founded by Vizier Ramesses I, whom Pharaoh Horemheb chose as his successor to the throne.

History

Background 
The warrior kings of the early 18th Dynasty had encountered only little resistance from neighbouring kingdoms, allowing them to expand their realm of influence easily, but the international situation had changed radically towards the end of the dynasty. The Hittites had gradually extended their influence into Syria and Canaan to become a major power in international politics, a power that both Seti I and his son Ramesses II would confront in the future.

19th Dynasty

Seti and Ramesses II 

The New Kingdom of Egypt reached the zenith of its power under Seti I and Ramesses II ("The Great"), who campaigned vigorously against the Libyans and the Hittites. The city of Kadesh was first captured by Seti I, who decided to concede it to Muwatalli of Hatti in an informal peace treaty between Egypt and Hatti. Ramesses II later attempted unsuccessfully to alter this situation in his fifth regnal year by launching an attack on Kadesh in his Second Syrian campaign in 1274 BC; he was caught in history's first recorded military ambush, but thanks to the arrival of the Ne'arin (a force allied with Egypt), Ramesses was able to rally his troops and turn the tide of battle against the Hittites. Ramesses II later profited from the Hittites' internal difficulties, during his eighth and ninth regnal years, when he campaigned against their Syrian possessions, capturing Kadesh and portions of Southern Syria, and advancing as far north as Tunip, where no Egyptian soldier had been seen for 120 years. He ultimately accepted that a campaign against the Hittites was an unsupportable drain on Egypt's treasury and military. In his 21st regnal year, Ramesses signed the earliest recorded peace treaty with Urhi-Teshub's successor, Hattusili III, and with that act Egypt-Hittite relations improved significantly. Ramesses II even married two Hittite princesses, the first after his second Sed Festival.

Merneptah 
This dynasty declined as infighting for the throne between the heirs of Merneptah increased. Amenmesse apparently usurped the throne from Merneptah's son and successor, Seti II, but he ruled Egypt for only four years. After his death, Seti regained power and destroyed most of Amenmesse's monuments. Seti was served at court by Chancellor Bay, who was originally just a 'royal scribe' but quickly became one of the most powerful men in Egypt, gaining the unprecedented privilege of constructing his own tomb in the Valley of the Kings (KV13). Both Bay and Seti's chief wife, Twosret, had a sinister reputation in Ancient Egyptian folklore. After Siptah's death, Twosret ruled Egypt for two more years, but she proved unable to maintain her hold on power amid the conspiracies and powerplays being hatched at the royal court. She was likely ousted in a revolt led by Setnakhte, founder of the 20th Dynasty.

Pharaohs of the 19th Dynasty

The pharaohs of the 19th Dynasty ruled for approximately 110 years: from c. 1292 to 1187 BC. Many of the pharaohs were buried in the Valley of the Kings in Thebes (designated KV). More information can be found on the Theban Mapping Project website.

Timeline of the 19th Dynasty

Gallery of images

See also
 List of children of Ramesses II

References

 
States and territories established in the 13th century BC
States and territories disestablished in the 12th century BC
19
New Kingdom of Egypt
13th century BC in Egypt
12th century BC in Egypt
13th-century BC establishments in Egypt
12th-century BC disestablishments in Egypt
19